Jeff Jacoby may refer to:
Jeff Jacoby (columnist) (born 1959), American journalist
Jeff Jacoby (sound artist) (contemporary), American sound and radio artist